Svetlana Boyko may refer to:

Svetlana Boyko (fencer)
Svetlana Boyko (speed skater)